Faloppio is a comune (municipality) in the Province of Como in the Italian region of Lombardy, located about  northwest of Milan and about  west of Como.

Faloppio borders the following municipalities: Albiolo, Colverde, Olgiate Comasco, Uggiate-Trevano.

References

External links
Official website

Cities and towns in Lombardy